Thieving from the House of God is the fifth full-length album by British stoner metal band Orange Goblin, released in 2004. The album features a cover of ZZ Top's "Just Got Paid".

Track listing

Personnel 
 Ben Ward – vocals, guitar
 Joe Hoare – guitar
 Martyn Millard – bass
 Chris Turner – drums
 Sarah Shanahan – backing vocals ("Black Egg")
 Tony Sylvester – backing vocals ("If It Ain't Broke, Break It")
 Billy Anderson – backing vocals ("If It Ain't Broke, Break It", "Crown of Locusts"), noises ("Crown of Locusts")
Produced, engineered, mixed and mastered by Billy Anderson

References 

2004 albums
Orange Goblin albums
Rise Above Records albums
Albums produced by Billy Anderson (producer)